Miitomo is a discontinued freemium social networking mobile app developed by Nintendo for iOS and Android devices. The app, Nintendo's first, allowed users to converse with friends by answering various questions, and featured Twitter and Facebook integration. The app was released in March 2016 for iOS and two months later for Android, launching alongside their My Nintendo service. Despite initially being a critical and commercial success, with over ten million downloads worldwide a month after release, its popularity dwindled soon after and it was ultimately discontinued on May 9, 2018.

Features

Miitomo served as a conversational app where users could communicate with friends by answering questions on various topics, such as favourite foods or current interests. Similar to Tomodachi Life, which some of the Miitomo development team also worked on, players used a Mii avatar which they could create from scratch or obtain from their My Nintendo account or a QR code, and gave it a computer generated voice and personality. Users could add friends to Miitomo by communicating directly with their device or by linking the app to their Facebook and Twitter accounts. By tapping their Mii, users could answer various questions which were shared with their friends, while tapping their thought bubble allowed them to hear answers from other friends. Users could visit, or be visited by, other friends and were able to answer certain questions that would only be shared with a specific friend. Players were also able to take pictures of their Mii, known as MiiFotos, which could be shared with friends as well as posted online.
Performing various actions in the app would earn Miitomo Coins, which could also be obtained through in-app purchases. These coins could be spent on various clothing items that can be used to customize the user's Mii. Additional clothing items could be obtained through the Miitomo Drop minigame, which could be played by either spending Miitomo Coins or using Game Tickets earned through play. The app was tied into My Nintendo'''s rewards scheme, with users able to earn Miitomo Platinum Points by clearing missions such as changing their outfits daily or linking their accounts. Miitomo Platinum Points could be exchanged for special item rewards or additional Game Tickets, or could be combined with standard Platinum Points for other My Nintendo rewards.

DevelopmentMiitomo was initially announced on October 25, 2015. Nintendo partnered with DeNA to leverage their understanding of mobile platforms as part of Nintendo's push for development on mobile devices, who were responsible for the service's infrastructure and My Nintendo integration. The app was first released in Nintendo's home market of Japan on March 17, 2016, and was later released in Western territories on March 31, 2016. The development team was headed up by Tomodachi Lifes core developers, under the supervision of Super Metroid director Yoshio Sakamoto. Additionally, Nintendo announced plans to update the app further beyond the launch period.

Albeit not required, users who linked their Nintendo Account to Miitomo enjoyed benefits such as cloud-saving. The app was released alongside the My Nintendo service respectively in all supported countries. Miitomo first launched in Japan on March 17, 2016, and by the end of the month, the app became officially available in all sixteen countries that were eligible for My Nintendo's pre-registration period. The app later became available in Mexico, Switzerland, and South Africa on June 30, 2016, and in Brazil on July 28, 2016. An update in November 2016 added five new features, enabling users to send messages to friends, customize their rooms, share their outfits with the world in "Style Central", publicly answer questions in "Answer Central", and allow for the creation of "Sidekick" Mii characters, which have their own rooms. Along with the major update, Miitomo launched in forty additional countries on the same day without any official announcements.

In January 2018, Nintendo announced that the game would be discontinued, with its servers being shut down on May 9, 2018. Nintendo also stated that a browser-based Mii Maker tool would be created in late May following the discontinuation of Miitomo, the likes of which could be used to transfer and save Mii characters created within the app.

Reception

In Japan, Miitomo had one million users within three days of its launch, overtaking the instant messenger Line as the most downloaded free app on the Japanese App Store. In the week after its initial launch, Nintendo's shares grew by eight percent following the success of the app. In less than 24 hours after its worldwide launch on March 31, the app already had three million users globally, and also rose to the top of the U.S. App Store, overtaking Snapchat. Miitomo later had 1.6 million downloads within its first four days in the United States. By April 2016, Miitomo had a user base of over 10 million users with 300 million conversations between friends and 20 million screenshots taken within the app itself.

Later observations conducted by SurveyMonkey, however, found that only a quarter of the people who had downloaded it regularly opened the app by May 2016, using it half as much as Candy Crush Saga and Clash Royale''.

Notes

References

External links
 

2016 software
2016 video games
Products and services discontinued in 2018
Android (operating system) games
Android (operating system) software
Communication software
Computer-related introductions in 2016
Cross-platform software
Discontinued iOS software
Free-to-play video games
Inactive massively multiplayer online games
Inactive online games
IOS games
IOS software
Nintendo Entertainment Planning & Development games
Nintendo games
Video games developed in Japan
Video games featuring protagonists of selectable gender
Video games with downloadable content